Ryan Cairns (born 12 February 1984) is a Zimbabwean professional golfer who plays on the Sunshine Tour.

Cairns was born in Harare, Zimbabwe. He joined the Sunshine Tour in 2007. He won his first professional event on the Big Easy Tour, the Sunshine Tour's developmental tour, in March 2012. On 11 May 2012, he won the Vodacom Origins of Golf at Simola Golf and Country Estate on the Sunshine Tour. He secured the victory in a playoff over Vaughn Groenewald when he chipped in for an eagle.

Cairns played on the Canadian Tour in 2008.

Amateur wins (3)
2002 African Junior Challenge, Mashonoland Amateur
2005 Southern Cape Closed Championship

Professional wins (2)

Sunshine Tour wins (1)

Sunshine Tour playoff record (1–0)

Big Easy Tour wins (1)

References

External links

Zimbabwean male golfers
Sunshine Tour golfers
White Zimbabwean sportspeople
Zimbabwean people of British descent
Sportspeople from Harare
1984 births
Living people